Instituto Cultural Dominico-Americano is an organization based in Santo Domingo, Dominican Republic. It is a collaboration between the Dominican and US governments.  They operate the Colegio Domínico-Americano, (in English, the School of the Dominican American Institute).

Education in the Dominican Republic
Educational organizations based in the Dominican Republic